Zagrepčanka is a high-rise office building located in Zagreb, Croatia. The address is Savska 41, on the Savska Road and Vukovar Avenue intersection.

Technical information

Zagrepčanka is ranked 4th by height (1st when you include the antenna) in Croatia. It is 94.6 meters (310 feet) tall, and it has 27 levels.
There is a radio mast on the roof, which increases the height of the tower to 109 meters (363 feet). There are two underground levels, used for parking spaces.
It's served by six elevators.
The building is a part of the complex, which includes a lowrise 3 level business objects, an art installation, and a fountain.

The tower has three parts. The center part has 26 floors, the west wing has 21 floor, and the east wing has 19 floors. The facade is derived in white marble, and a reflective green glass. There are 23 three-apses protrusions, which run from the 25th to 26th floor. The center wing has 24 support beams, and the side wings have 23 beams. The side wings are hyperbolically curved over the vertical axis.

History 

The tower was built in 1976 by architects Slavko Jelinek and Berislav Vinković, who drew their inspiration from the Thyssen-Haus building in Düsseldorf.

Less than ten years after the completion, heavy marble tiles started to fall off from the facade. This was largely due to the low weather resistance of Carrara marble that had been used for the construction. The problem was most pronounced in the southern, Sun-exposed face. Because of the danger, the employees had to enter the tower through an improvised tunnel, made out of the wooden planks and steel bars. By 2014, the eastern and the western face of the building have been repaired by replacing 5000 square meters of tiles.

Zagrepčanka was surpassed in (structural) height by the Eurotower (97.8 m) in 2006. But it still holds the No.1 place in the real height (109 m), and it has the Croatia's highest office.

Zagrepčanka 512, an annual foot race up the staircase, has been held since 2012.

See also 
 List of tallest buildings in Croatia

Views of Zagrepčanka

References

External links 

 Zagrepčanka on Emporis
 Arhitekt koji je volio nebodere 

Buildings and structures in Zagreb
Skyscraper office buildings in Croatia
Modernist architecture in Croatia
Office buildings completed in 1976